The snake skin hunter slug (Chlamydephorus dimidius)  is a species of land slug in the family Chlamydephoridae. It is endemic to South Africa, where it is known from six localities in KwaZulu-Natal.

This slug lives in fragmented forest habitat, mostly in coastal areas.

References

Endemic fauna of South Africa
Chlamydephoridae
Gastropods described in 1915
Taxonomy articles created by Polbot